Pascal Kelleghan (born in Rhode, County Offaly) is an Irish Gaelic footballer who plays for his local club Rhode and at senior level for the Offaly county team. He is also a manager.

Playing
At club level with Rhode, he won county championships in 2004, 2005, 2006, 2008, 2010 and 2012.

With his county, Kelleghan played in the 2006 Leinster Senior Football Championship final but was on the losing side to Dublin.

Mamenegemnt
Kelleghan has also had much success as a manager at club level.

He managed Meath GAA club Ballinabrackey to county and Leinster Junior Club Football Championship honours.

In 2012, he led Kildare GAA club Monasterevin to county and Leinster Intermediate Club Football Championship titles.

In 2011, he was appointed as manager of the Offaly under-21 football team.

In 2014, he led an Offaly minor team that was expected to have success.

References

Living people
Gaelic football managers
Offaly inter-county Gaelic footballers
Rhode Gaelic footballers
Year of birth uncertain
Year of birth missing (living people)